The 1934 Hillman's Airways de Havilland Dragon Rapide crash occurred on 2 October 1934 when a de Havilland DH.89A Dragon Rapide of Hillman's Airways crashed into the English Channel off Folkestone, Kent, killing all seven people on board. The aircraft was operating an international scheduled passenger flight from Abridge Aerodrome to Le Bourget Airport, Paris. The accident resulted in the first write-off of a Dragon Rapide.

Aircraft
The accident aircraft was de Havilland DH.89A Dragon Rapide G-ACPM, c/n 6251. This aircraft was the first production Dragon Rapide. The aircraft had been entered in the 1934 King's Cup Race by Lord Wakefield but withdrew at Waddington following hail damage. It had been delivered to Hillman's Airways on 27 July.

Accident
The flight had departed Abridge at 10 am. At 10.47, the aircraft was approaching the coast and the pilot asked Croydon for a radio bearing. The bearing received placed him north of Dover. The normal route in conditions of bad visibility was from Dungeness to Le Touquet. The pilot turned south to regain his course. At about 11:02, the aircraft dived into the sea and was destroyed, killing all seven people on board.

The crash was heard by the crew of the German . A boat was lowered and some wreckage and two bodies were discovered within ten minutes. Visibility at the time was poor in patchy rain with a cloudbase of  The British coaster SS Snowcrete joined the search. Its boat recovered a third body. The Southern Railway's cross-channel ferry  also joined the search. Two more bodies were recovered. The victims were transferred to Biarritz which took them to Folkestone before resuming her voyage to Boulogne. The Dover Lifeboat and a tug from Dover searched for the remaining two victims. Wreckage from the aircraft was landed at Dover and Folkestone. The accident resulted in the first write-off of a Dragon Rapide.

The inquest into the deaths of the five people whose bodies had been recovered was opened by the Folkestone Coroner at Folkestone Town Hall on 4 October. Evidence was given that the aircraft had probably crashed into the sea at high speed and all victims had died from multiple injuries. A verdict of "accidental death" was returned on all five victims.

An Air Ministry investigation determined the cause of the accident to be pilot error due to the pilot's lack of experience in navigation and blind flying. The sea was calm and the pilot was unable to distinguish its surface.

Casualties
The nationalities of the victims were:

References

Aviation accidents and incidents in 1934
Accidents and incidents involving the de Havilland Dragon Rapide
Aviation accidents and incidents in Kent
Folkestone
1934 in England
History of the English Channel
Hillman's Airways accidents and incidents
1934 disasters in the United Kingdom
October 1934 events